Ryan Leef (born December 28, 1973) is a Canadian politician, who represented the riding of Yukon in the House of Commons of Canada as a member of the Conservative Party from 2011 to 2015.

Early life
Born in Ontario in 1973, Leef grew up in Dawson City, Yukon. He has overseen prisoners as an assistant superintendent at Whitehorse Correctional Centre which was his most recent employment prior to politics. He is also a former member of the Royal Canadian Mounted Police, a Wildlife Officer and an investigator for Yukon Department of Justice. He has also fought in the cage as a Mixed Martial Arts fighter. He is a strong supporter and advocate of the sport.

Leef's family moved to the Yukon in 1984 and he has subsequently lived in many communities throughout the territory. Leef lives in Whitehorse and has one son, Aaron.

Political career
Leef was first elected in May 2011 federal election. He was appointed to the Standing Committee on Fisheries and Ocean and the Standing Committee on Natural resources. He joined the Canada-Germany, Canada-United States, and Canada-Philippines interparliamentary groups and chairs the Canada-Australia-New Zealand Parliamentary Friendship Group. Leef also chaired the Northern Caucus and the MMA Caucus, co-chairs the Hunting and Angling Caucus and sits on BC/Yukon, Outdoor and National Caucuses.

Leef was noted in national media when he claimed that the polar bear population had increased dramatically. His position was refuted by polar bear researchers and according to one scientist was based on a report prepared by "professional climate change deniers."

Leef was defeated in 2015 by former MP Larry Bagnell, after serving just one term as a member of parliament, with Leef garnering 24% of ballots and Bagnell garnering 53.6% of the vote, despite Leef spending more than twice as much as Bagnell on the campaign.

Philanthropy
Throughout his political career Leef endeavoured on many philanthropic projects under the banner of Inspiration Unlimited, including his "Border to Border Trek" across Yukon. The trek will see Leef running across the three Yukon borders over the course of three summers. Leef has already successfully completed his 1,200-kilometre journey from the northernmost point of the territory to British Columbia.

In October 2012, Leef ran in the Goodlife Fitness Victoria Marathon to raise money for the Canadian Diabetes Association.

Using his background as a Department of Justice  defense tactics instructor  Leef has led "Leaders in Life Mixed Martial Arts Against Bullying" clinics. He also hosts an annual chilli cook off to benefit the Whitehorse Food Bank as well as a women's self-defence workshop to benefit the Yukon White Ribbon Campaign.

Controversy
Leef has had a few brushes with the law, and one conviction. In 2007, he was found to have declared that a thinhorn sheep, which was shot by a Colorado trophy hunter he was guiding at the time, was shot in an area where it had not, in fact, been shot. The judge did not convict Leef, as he stated it was likely a careless mistake, however, the Yukon Supreme Court found Leef guilty of making a false statement on the export form. In the same incident, Leef was charged by Conservation Officers with transporting the same sheep on an ATV in an area where ATVs were not allowed, but the judge found that it was not possible to prove beyond a reasonable doubt that Leef had in fact used an ATV at the time. These charges occurred during the time that Leef was also employed as a Conservation Officer for the Yukon Territory.

In addition, during Leef's 2015 campaign to be re-elected, he performed a citizen's arrest on a civilian who he caught defacing some campaign signs of his, at night, during a rainstorm.

Electoral history

References

1973 births
Members of the House of Commons of Canada from Yukon
Conservative Party of Canada MPs
Living people
Politicians from Whitehorse
Place of birth missing (living people)
21st-century Canadian politicians